Wangmo County is a county in the southwest of Guizhou province, China, bordering Guangxi to the southeast. It is under the administration of the Qianxinan Buyei and Miao Autonomous Prefecture.

Climate
Wangmo recorded  of rainfall in one hour, on 9 June 2011, the most rainfall in the county in 200 years.
And on 20 June 2011,  of rain fell in 3hrs in the county  as part of significant flooding across the region.

External links

County-level divisions of Guizhou
Qianxinan Buyei and Miao Autonomous Prefecture